Mujahid Alam (born 27 December 1969) is an Indian politician. He was the member of Bihar Legislative Assembly May 2014 to November 2020 and represented Kochadhaman Vidhan Sabha constituency.

Early life and education 
Alam was born in village Kairi Birpur in Kishanganj, Bihar and completed his Bachelor of Arts (Honours) at Patna College in 1990.

Personal life 
His father's name is Jamilur Rahman. Mujahid Alam is married to Gulchaman Roshan Ara. He has three daughters.

Political career 
He entered politics in the year 2010. He was elected as a member of the Bihar Legislative Assembly in May 2014 Kochadhaman assembly by-election as JD(U) candidate. And again retained his seat in 2015 Bihar Vidhan Sabha election by defeating Akhtarul Iman of AIMIM. He was unable to hold his position in 2020 assembly election and lost to Izhar Asfi of AIMIM by a margin of more than 40000 votes.

References 

People from Kishanganj district
Bihari politicians
1969 births
Living people
Bihar MLAs 2015–2020
Janata Dal (United) politicians
Bihar MLAs 2020–2025